The United States Virgin Islands competed at the 1994 Winter Olympics in Lillehammer, Norway.

Competitors
The following is the list of number of competitors in the Games.

Bobsleigh

Luge 

Men

Women

References

Sources
Official Olympic Reports

External links
 

Nations at the 1994 Winter Olympics
Winter Olympics
1994 Winter Olympics